Ricardo Alberto Barreda (16 June 1936 – 24 November 2020) was an Argentine dentist who was found guilty of murdering his wife, Gladys McDonald, his two daughters, Cecilia and Adriana Barreda, and his mother-in-law, Elena Arreche on 15 November 1992. He was granted parole on 29 March 2011, and he died two months later from a cardiac arrest.

References 

1936 births
2020 deaths
Argentine prisoners sentenced to life imprisonment
Argentine mass murderers
Argentine dentists
National University of La Plata alumni
Femicide in Argentina

Familicides
Violence against women in Argentina
Deaths from ventricular tachycardia